The Cleveland Sight Center (CSC) is a non-profit organization that provides services to individuals who are blind or visually impaired. Founded in 1906, it is accredited by the Commission on Accreditation of Rehabilitation Facilities (CARF) and serves around 10,000 clients annually in Northeast Ohio. The organization also has radio-reading and community outreach programs that benefit a larger number of individuals.

CSC offers a variety of services, including educational and rehabilitative services, social and recreational activities, and a summer camp program at Highbrook Lodge. They also have a Low Vision Clinic and Eyedea Shop. The staff includes over 100 professionals, including social workers, optometrists, vision rehabilitation therapists, orientation and mobility instructors, occupational therapists, educators, and nurses, who work to help clients achieve independence. Services and activities are tailored to different age groups but many overlap, enabling clients to gain independence in all areas of their life.

History
The Cleveland Sight Center was founded in 1906 under the name Cleveland Society for the Blind, inspired by an 1898 project at Goodrich House which, among other things, encouraged enrollment of blind and visually impaired individuals in the Cleveland Public School System. In early 1906, with support from the Cleveland Public Library system, Visiting Nursing Association, related charities, area settlement houses, and the American Foundation for the Blind under Robert B. Irwin, the Society for the Blind was established.
In 1989 it was renamed as Cleveland Sight Center of the Cleveland Society for the Blind

Leadership
In April, 2015, Cuyahoga County Development Director, Larry Benders, became the tenth President and Executive Director of the Cleveland Sight Center. Benders had served as the director of the Cuyahoga County Workforce Investment Board. He had also served as the Director of Marketing for the Rock and Roll Hall of Fame and Museum.

Available technologies 
CSC's STORER Center offers a wide variety of technologies and training to its clients, including computers, CCTVs, voice control (Dragon & J-Say), software magnification (ZoomText & MAGic), screen reader (JAWS, Window Eyes, System Access), optical character recognition (Kurzweil, OpenBook, and OmniPage), Braille translation (Duxbury), digital recorders, and digital book players, Braille embossers, refreshable Braille displays, note takers (PacMate, BrailleNote, and Braille+), and Microsoft Office products (Word, Outlook, Excel, PowerPoint, Access)

Orientation & mobility 
Cleveland Sight Center's PREP program evaluates the extent of a client's needs for effective independent travel, creating a personalized orientation and mobility training plan catered to the individual's specific needs and age group.

Employment services 
Cleveland Sight Center's Employment Department helps adults who are blind or visually impaired seek and maintain career opportunities. Working in conjunction with the STORER Center and PREP, Employment Services informs clients and employers of the accommodations available to help the blind and visually impaired utilize their abilities and talents to their fullest capacity in the workplace.

After determining what career interests clients have and/or are best suited for via its comprehensive vocational evaluation system, staff provide clients with training in various areas of job readiness, from learning to fill out applications and develop their resumes to practicing job interviews and learning about employer expectations. Through networking and partnerships with various organizations in northeast Ohio, including Progressive Field, the Great Lakes Science Center, and the Rock and Roll Hall of Fame, employment services helps connect clients with employers and secure work. Once a client finds permanent work, he/she is monitored for 90 days during which employment services determines what accommodations the client needs to perform at optimal efficiency.

Cleveland Sight Center also has a Call Center. The Call Center launched in 2010 and provides call center services to Ohio's government agencies. The Call Center now has a workforce of over 70 representatives - nearly all of whom have a work-limiting disability. Over 500,000 calls and 50,000 emails are handled each year with measurably excellent levels of customer service.

Early intervention 
Cleveland Sight Center's Early Intervention program works with children from birth to 3 years old and their families to help them overcome or minimize developmental delays, including adjusting to vision loss.

The program staff includes an early interventionist, occupational therapist, physical therapist and a speech and language therapist who conduct assessments and activities, host weekly support groups, and provide encouragement and information for each family through these most crucial first three years of the client's life.

Preschool 
Cleveland Sight Center's Bright Futures Preschool—a part of the Sight Center's Children's Department—is a program for 3- to 5-year-old children who have disabilities, including visual impairments. Children without any disabilities are also welcome.

Students each receive assessments conducted by the Early Intervention staff, resulting in the creation of personalized lesson plans for them in typical areas of importance for developing children. The students participate in the program four times a week.

Highbrook Lodge Camp 
Highbrook Lodge is Cleveland Sight Center's ACA Accredited summer camp spanning over 60 acres in Geauga County. Camp sessions are held throughout the months of June, July, and August, each focusing on a specific age group.

Activities 
 Arts and Crafts - learning how to participate in arts and crafts with a visual impairment
 Book Club - discussion groups to discuss books campers are reading. Books on tape are available.
 Camper councils - through events like talent shows and cabin-cleaning, camper councils offer opportunities for campers to share information with each other while developing leadership skills
 Evening Programs - dances, campfires, music, competitions, etc. provide entertainment and socializing opportunities for campers
 Sports and Recreation - sports like beeper ball and archery provide team-building and socialization skills
 Field Trips - broaden the campers' horizons and act as good opportunities for additional orientation and mobility training

Facilities 
 Smith Lodge - primary camp lodge used as a meeting place for meals and various evening activities
 Tall Timber Lodge - two cabins connected by a large common area with a porch overlooking Robert's Field.
 Lester Sears Recreation Hall - location for various indoor activities, including dances, talent shows, and arts and crafts.
 heated swimming pool
 outdoor bowling alley
 three accessible playgrounds
 Robert's Recreational Field and baseball diamond
 outdoor chapel

Events

White Cane Walk
White Cane Walk is CSC's annual fundraiser to raise awareness and support for the blind and visually impaired community. The walk, hosted at Cleveland Sight Center, educates participants about the importance of the white cane, the blind and visually impaired community and Cleveland Sight Center.

Golf Classic
Cleveland Sight Center hosts an annual Golf Classic in the summer that helps raise money to support programs and services.

See also
 Visual impairment
 Blindness
 White cane
 Low vision
 Guide dog
 Orientation and mobility
 Cleveland

References

Further reading
 "Cleveland Sight Center: VisionAWARE." Information For Adults Experiencing Low Vision, Vision Loss, and Blindness. Retrieved 22 Dec 2010. http://www.visionaware.org/Cleveland-Sight-Center.
 The Cleveland Foundation. Retrieved 22 Dec 2010. https://web.archive.org/web/20101214050013/http://www.clevelandfoundation.org/Donors/BecomingADonor/DonorProfiles.html.

Healthcare in Cleveland